Hsieh Cheng-peng and Yang Tsung-hua were the defending champions but lost in the semifinals to Sanchai and Sonchat Ratiwatana.

Marco Chiudinelli and Franko Škugor won the title after defeating Ratiwatana and Ratiwatana 4–6, 6–2, [10–5] in the final.

Seeds

Draw

References

External links
 Main draw

Santaizi ATP Challenger - Doubles
2017 Doubles
2017 in Taiwanese tennis